is a judicial decision concerning the information rights of a beneficiary under a discretionary trust.

Facts
Mr Vadim Schmidt sought disclosure of accounts and information in relation to two trusts set up by his father, who had died intestate. Rosewood Trustee Ltd was the trustee of the two relevant trusts, having assumed that office from Lorne House Trust Ltd (the original trustee).  Mr Schmidt had a discretionary interest under the settlement and sought disclosure in his capacity as a beneficiary as well as in his capacity as the administrator of his father's estate.

The defendant trustee argued that Schmidt was not entitled to disclosure of the trust documents because he did not have a proprietary interest under the trust (being only "a mere object of a power"). Nor, the defendant trustee argued, had the father been the settlor under the trust, which had been executed by Pacquerette Ltd as settlor (the nominee of Mr Schmidt).

Advice
The Privy Council rejected the previous proprietary explanation of a beneficiary's right to disclosure that had been set out in Re Londonderry's Settlement [1965] Ch 918 per Salmon LJ. Rather, Lord Walker (giving the advice of the Privy Council) held that: "the Board cannot regard it as a reasoned or binding decision that a beneficiary's right of claim to disclosure of trust documents or information must always have the proprietary basis of a transmissible interest in trust property." (at [50]) Lord Walker went further, writing that a proprietary interest under a trust "is neither sufficient nor necessary" (at [54]). Disclosure to a beneficiary having a proprietary interest has thus become a matter of discretion, although the nature of the interest is relevant to the court's consideration of whether to exercise its discretion.

Lord Walker made the following clear.

See also

Re Londonderry's Settlement [1965] Ch 918

Notes

References
David Pollard, 'Schmidt v Rosewood Trust Ltd [2003] UKPC 26 [2003] 2 WLR 1442.' (2003) 17(2) Trust Law International 90-95
RC Nolan, 'Equitable property' (2006) 122 LQR 232-265

English trusts case law
2003 in the Isle of Man
2003 in British law
2003 in case law
Judicial Committee of the Privy Council cases on appeal from the Isle of Man